Stictea infensa is a moth of the  family Tortricidae. It is known from Australia, including Queensland and New South Wales. It is also found in New Zealand.

The wingspan is about 19 mm.

The larvae feed on Eucalyptus species.

References

Olethreutini
Moths of New Zealand
Moths described in 1911